Baron McGowan, of Ardeer in the County of Ayr Scotland, is a title in the Peerage of the United Kingdom.
The current title holder is Harry John Charles McGowan, 4th Baron McGowan.

Baron McGowan, of Ardeer
The title was created in 1937 for Sir Harry McGowan, Chairman of Imperial Chemical Industries.  the title is held by his great-grandson, the fourth Baron, who succeeded his father in 2003.

The family seat is Highway House, Lower Froyle, Hampshire.

Ancestry
The McGowan family is related to the Earls of Cottenham and the renowned Diarist, MP and Naval administrator Samuel Pepys through the current Baron's mother Lady Gillian Angela Pepys, daughter of John Digby Thomas Pepys, 7th Earl of Cottenham. The family is also descended from the House of Neville through Lady Angela Isabel Nevill, grandmother of the 4th Baron. This connection names Kings Edward III, Edward IV and Richard III among the family's ancestors.

The current title holder, Harry John Charles McGowan's immediate family include his sisters, Hon. Emma Louisa Angela McGowan and Hon. Annabel Kate Cory McGowan, and his daughters, Hon. Sophie Isabella Fox McGowan and Hon. Martha Davina Fox McGowan.

Barons McGowan (1937)
Harry Duncan McGowan, 1st Baron McGowan (1874–1961)
Harry Wilson McGowan, 2nd Baron McGowan (1906–1966)
Harry Duncan Cory McGowan, 3rd Baron McGowan (1938–2003)
Harry John Charles McGowan, 4th Baron McGowan (b. 1971)

The heir presumptive is the present holder's uncle Hon. Dominic James Wilson McGowan (b. 1951).

Line of succession

The Honourable Mungo Alexander Cansh McGowan (b. 1956)

James Alexander Cory McGowan (b.1985)

Arms

Ancestry & family tree
(Please click "show" to Expand the box below)

References

Kidd, Charles, Williamson, David (editors). Debrett's Peerage and Baronetage (1990 edition). New York: St Martin's Press, 1990, 

Debrett's Peerage, 1968, p. 287, Pepys, Earl of Cottenham
Debrett's Peerage, 1968, p. 1015, Talbot, Earl of Shrewsbury

Baronies in the Peerage of the United Kingdom
Noble titles created in 1937